Jameel Saleem Jameel Al-Yahmadi (born 27 July 1996) is an Omani professional footballer who plays for Al-Markhiya and the Oman national team as a midfielder or forward.

Career

International
Al-Yahmadi made his debut for Oman national football team in a friendly match on 24 March 2016 against Guam. He was included in Oman's squad for the 2017 CISM World Football Cup in Oman, the 2018 AFC U-23 Championship in China and the 2019 AFC Asian Cup in the United Arab Emirates.

Career statistics

International
Statistics accurate as of match played 23 March 2019

International goals
Scores and results list Oman's goal tally first.

References

External links

1996 births
Living people
Omani footballers
Oman international footballers
Association football midfielders
Association football forwards
Al-Shabab SC (Seeb) players
Al-Wakrah SC players
Al-Shahania SC players
Al-Markhiya SC players
Expatriate footballers in Qatar
Omani expatriate sportspeople in Qatar
Oman Professional League players
Qatari Second Division players
Qatar Stars League players
2019 AFC Asian Cup players